This is a list of Home Ownership Scheme (HOS) and Private Sector Participation Scheme (PSPS) Estates in Hong Kong. Estates of Green Form Subsidised Home Ownership Scheme (GFSHOS) and My Home Purchase Plan (MHPP) are also shown in the lists.

They are housing estates sold by Hong Kong Housing Authority (HKHA) and Hong Kong Housing Society.

Central and Western District, Wan Chai District
nil

Eastern District

Southern District

Yau Tsim Mong District

Sham Shui Po District

Kowloon City District

Ho Man Tin

Kai Tak

Hung Hom

Wong Tai Sin District

Kwun Tong District

Sai Kung District

Sai Kung

Tseung Kwan O

Kwai Tsing District

Kwai Chung

Tsing Yi

Tsuen Wan District

Tuen Mun District

Yuen Long District

Yuen Long Town

Tin Shui Wai

Ping Shan

North District

Fanling

Sheung Shui

Tai Po District

Sha Tin District

Sha Tin, Tai Wai and Fo Tan

Ma On Shan

Islands District

See also
Home Ownership Scheme
Private Sector Participation Scheme
List of public housing estates in Hong Kong

References

External links
Hong Kong Housing Authority HOS and PSPS courts

 
 
Home Ownership Scheme